@ANCAlerts (stylized as @ancalerts) is a social media news program of ABS-CBN News Channel in the Philippines which started from ANC’s influential Twitter account that has over 450,000 followers to date, aimed to keep viewers abreast of the hottest social media buzz, user-generated content, "Bayan Mo, iPatrol Mo" stories, and real time feedback from ANC viewers. It airs on weekdays at 5:00 p.m. and anchored by social media enthusiasts Lexi Schulze. It premiere on June 11, 2012. The show concluded on March 29, 2019.

Anchors
Lexi Schulze

Former Anchors
TJ Manotoc
Ai Dela Cruz

See also
List of programs shown on the ABS-CBN News Channel
ABS-CBN News Channel

References

Notes
 https://ph.news.yahoo.com/anc-asserts-stand-accuracy-vs-timeliness-debate-051056864.html
 http://rodmagaru.com/2012/06/06/tv-ancalerts-afternoon-shows-anc/

ABS-CBN News Channel original programming
ABS-CBN news shows
2012 Philippine television series debuts
2019 Philippine television series endings
English-language television shows